Edward Samuel Harper (1854 – 7 February 1941) was the President of the Royal Birmingham Society of Artists from 1935 to 1938. He was known as a jeweller and taught drawing and painting at Birmingham School of Art for a period of 40 years.

Harper was born in Handsworth (then in Staffordshire) and died in Harborne. On 12 March 1881 he was elected an associate member of the Royal Birmingham Society of Artists.

References

External links 
 

1854 births
1941 deaths
People from Handsworth, West Midlands
British jewellers
Members and Associates of the Royal Birmingham Society of Artists